At least three ships of the Brazilian Navy have borne the name Alagoas

 , a  launched in 1867 and scrapped in 1900
 , a  launched in 1909 and stricken in 1939
 , a  formerly USS Buck acquired in 1973 and stricken in 1995

Brazilian Navy ship names